The Amaradia (also: Amaradia Pietroasă) is a left tributary of the river Jiu in Romania. It discharges into the Jiu in Drăguțești, south of the city Târgu Jiu.

Tributaries

The following rivers are tributaries to the river Amaradia (from source to mouth):

Left: Gornac, Zlast
Right: Grui, Inoasa, Holdun

References

Rivers of Romania
Rivers of Gorj County